Pieter Aldrich and Danie Visser were the defending champions, but lost in the first round to Paul Haarhuis and Mark Koevermans. Scott Davis and David Pate won the title, defeating Patrick McEnroe and David Wheaton 6–1, 4–6, 6–4, 5–7, 9–7, in the final. This was Pate's first Grand Slam title and final, despite gaining the World No. 1 ranking two weeks earlier.
John Fitzgerald and Anders Järryd lost in the third round to McEnroe and Wheaton. It was their only Grand Slam loss of the year, as they would go on to win the following three majors in 1991.

Seeds

Draw

Finals

Top half

Section 1

Section 2

Bottom half

Section 3

Section 4

External links
 1991 Australian Open – Men's draws and results at the International Tennis Federation

Men's Doubles
1991